Brahmapurisvarar Temple, Perambur is a Siva temple in Perambur  in Mayiladuthurai district in Tamil Nadu (India).

Vaippu Sthalam
It is one of the shrines of the Vaippu Sthalams sung by Tamil Saivite Nayanar Appar. This place was known as Pirambil.

Presiding deity
The presiding deity in the garbhagriha, represented by the lingam, is Brahmapurisvarar. The Goddess is known as Anandavalli. Earlier this temple was found in the back side and after dilapidation, the sculptures of presiding deity and the goddess was kept in the Subramania temple. As the presiding deity and the goddess are kept in the prakara of the temple, the presiding deity is  Subramania. Sculptures of Vinayaka and Lakshmi Narayana Perumal are also found along with these sculptures. Agastya is also found in this temple.

Location
This temple is located in Perambur in Mayiladuthurai-Porayar road (Via Manganallur), at a distance of 8 km from Manganallur.

References

Shiva temples in Mayiladuthurai district